Kenan İpek (born 5 October 1959) is a Turkish legal prosecutor and judge who served as the Minister of Justice of Turkey from 7 March to 17 November 2015. Having previously served as the Undersecretary to the Justice Ministry, İpek succeeded the Justice and Development Party minister Bekir Bozdağ as the Minister of Justice in accordance to Article 114 of the Turkish Constitution three months before the June 2015 general election. He is, formally, of no political affiliation, and concurrently served as the President of the Supreme Board of Judges and Prosecutors during his time as Minister.

Early life and career

Born in Rize in 1959, İpek graduated from the Istanbul University Faculty of Law in 1982. In 1983, he applied to join the judiciary in Istanbul and subsequently served in numerous roles as a Prosecutor. On 12 November 1997, he joined the Ministry of Justice, becoming the Prisons Manager on 6 October 2003 and as a senior advisor to the Ministry on 26 August 2008. He served in this position until 31 December 2013, becoming the Undersecretary to the Minister on 1 January 2014.

Minister of Justice
With the Constitution requiring that the serving partisan Minister should vacate his position to his or her Undersecretary at least three months before a general election, İpek took over from Bekir Bozdağ as Minister of Justice on 7 March 2015 and is due to serve until a new government is formed after the election. As the Minister of Justice, İpek concurrently serves as the President of the Supreme Board of Judges and Prosecutors. The other ministers who replaced partisan ministers due to the constitutional requirement were Sebahattin Öztürk, who replaced Efkan Ala as the Minister of the Interior and Feridun Bilgin, replacing Lütfi Elvan as the Transport, Maritime and Communications Minister.

Judicial suspension controversy
In late April, the Supreme board of Judges and Prosecutors (HSYK), of which İpek serves as the President, suspended the judges who ordered the release of imprisoned Samanyolu TV broadcaster Hidayet Karaca and 70 other police officers. The individuals were being held due to alleged links with the anti-government Gülen movement led by exiled Fethullah Gülen, with Karaca being accused of establishing an armed terrorist organisation. In a statement, İpek claimed that the judges who ordered their release did so illegally from an illegal court and suspended them indefinitely while also accusing them of being followers of Fethullah Gülen. He further stated that attempts to destabilise the social order and the employment of illegal methods to do so would be curbed. President Recep Tayyip Erdoğan also openly supported their suspension, while opposition commentators accused the government of undermining the rule of law and the independence of the Judiciary.

In May, the HSYK expelled and suspended indefinitely four judges and a prosecutor involved in the investigation of the 2013 government corruption scandal.

See also
62nd Government of Turkey
2013 corruption scandal in Turkey
Supreme Board of Judges and Prosecutors

External links
Website of the Supreme Board of Judges and Prosecutors
www.justice.gov.tr: Government website (English)

References

1959 births
Living people
Ministers of Justice of Turkey
Istanbul University alumni
Istanbul University Faculty of Law alumni
Members of the 63rd government of Turkey
People from Rize
Turkish judges